Robert 'Two Bobs' Roberts (born 21 June 1978) is a former Wales international rugby league footballer who played in the 1990s and 2000s. He played at club level for Hull FC, Huddersfield Giants, Halifax, Hunslet Hawks, Leigh Centurions, Oldham and the Barrow Raiders.

Background
Roberts was born in Leeds, West Yorkshire, England.

Personal life
Roberts' son, Josh Jordan-Roberts, is also a professional rugby league footballer.
Also has an daughter. 
Roberts is the current coach of East Leeds ARLFC open age Pennine league Team who he played with in his youth.

References

External links
(archived by web.archive.org) Barrow Raiders profile
(archived by web.archive.org) Oldham R.L.F.C. profile

1978 births
Living people
Barrow Raiders players
English rugby league players
English people of Welsh descent
Halifax R.L.F.C. players
Huddersfield Giants players
Hull F.C. players
Hunslet R.L.F.C. players
Leigh Leopards players
Oldham R.L.F.C. players
Rugby league players from Leeds
Rugby league props
Rugby league second-rows
Wales national rugby league team players